Gallows on the Sand is a 1956 novel by Morris West. It was the first novel he published under his own name. He later claimed it was written in seven days for $250 in order to pay a tax bill after he had had a nervous breakdown. West credited the book as launching his career as a novelist. However a later review of the author's career dismissed it as a "potboiler".

It was serialised for radio.

The book was re-released in 1963 as part of Angus and Robertson's Pacific Book series.

Premise
Historican Renn Lundigan hunts for treasure off the Great Barrier Reef. The treasure is minted Spanish gold in a sunken galleon. Renn has to deal with islander Johnny Akimoto, gambling house owner Manny Mannix and beautiful young scientist Pat Mitchell.

Reception
The Argus said "in spite of a tendency to the rather slick "Randy Stone" radio style, it is a bright, exciting yarn, guaranteed to take your mind off workaday cares. "

The Pacific Island Monthly called it "a buried treasure trifle." "

External links
Gallows on the Sand at AustLit

References

1956 novels
Works by Morris West